Tove Liv Besstun Veierød (born 19 September 1940) is a Norwegian politician for the Labour Party. She was the state secretary to the Minister of Culture and Science 1986–1988, and Minister of Social Affairs 1990–1992.

References

1940 births
Living people
Government ministers of Norway